The Egon-Schiele-Museum is a museum in Tulln, Lower Austria dedicated to the Austrian painter Egon Schiele, who was born in Tulln.

History 
The Egon Schiele-Museum was planned in 1980. The jail in Tulln which was built in 1898 has been renovated for that reason. Schiele was in the jail in 1912. The opening of the museum was on June 12, 1990, the 100th anniversary of Egon Schiele's birth. 

There are more than 100 objects shown in 12 rooms. 90 paintings of Schiele and many photographs of his life and his family are exhibited. On the ground floor there are pieces related to Schiele's childhood in Tulln, as well as relics of his school-time in Klosterneuburg and his time as a student in Vienna. There are a lot of drawings by the young artists.

Famous paintings include Blick über verschneite Weingärten auf Klosterneuburg which Schiele painted in 1907, and the Old Mill from 1916

Further information 
The Egon Schiele-Museum is situated near the Danube river. There are exhibitions of contemporary artists every year.

References

Books 
 Egon Schiele (Bilder), Peter Weninger: Egon Schiele-Museum, Tulln: eine Dokumentation zu Leben und Werk von Egon Schiele (1890 Tulln-1918 Wien) 1991.

External links 
  
 Egon Schiele Museum at Niederösterreichs Museen & Sammlungen

Art museums and galleries in Austria
Art museums established in 1990
Museums in Lower Austria
1990 establishments in Austria
20th-century architecture in Austria